Araripichthys is an extinct genus of ray-finned fish that lived from the Aptian to Coniacian stages of the Cretaceous period. The genus is named after the Araripe Basin, where it was found in the Crato and Santana Formations. Other fossils of the genus have been found at Goulmima in Morocco, the Tlayua Formation of Mexico and the Apón Formation of Venezuela.

References

Prehistoric teleostei
Prehistoric ray-finned fish genera
Early Cretaceous fish
Late Cretaceous fish
Aptian genus first appearances
Albian genera
Turonian genera
Cenomanian genera
Coniacian genus extinctions
Cretaceous fish of Africa
Cretaceous Morocco
Fossils of Morocco
Cretaceous fish of North America
Cretaceous Mexico
Fossils of Mexico
Cretaceous fish of South America
Early Cretaceous animals of South America
Cretaceous Brazil
Fossils of Brazil
Crato Formation
Romualdo Formation
Cretaceous Venezuela
Fossils of Venezuela
Fossil taxa described in 1985